Real-World Economics Review is a peer-reviewed open access academic journal of heterodox economics published by the "Post-Autistic Economics Network" since 2000. Since 2011 it is associated with the World Economics Association. It was known formerly as the Post-Autistic Economics Review and the Post-Autistic Economics Newsletter. Previous issues are archived on its website. Two sister journals from the same publisher are Economic Thought and World Economics Review.

The journal is part of the post-autistic economics movement, and, as such, heavily criticizes neoclassical economics. It accepts contributions from diverse schools of economic thought.

See also 
 Real-world economics
 List of open access journals
 Review of Radical Political Economics

References

External links 
 
 World Economics Association

Economics journals
Publications established in 2000
English-language journals
Open access journals